Wayland H. and Mamie Burt Stevens House is a historic home located at Fuquay-Varina, Wake County, North Carolina.  The house was built in 1936, and is a two-story, Colonial Revival style brick dwelling with a hipped roof. It features an entry portico and a front door with fanlight and sidelights. Also on the property are the contributing garage (1936) and tool shed (1936).

It was listed on the National Register of Historic Places in 2014.

References 

Houses on the National Register of Historic Places in North Carolina
Colonial Revival architecture in North Carolina
Houses completed in 1936
Houses in Wake County, North Carolina
National Register of Historic Places in Wake County, North Carolina
1936 establishments in North Carolina